Ernests Gulbis was the defending champion, but chose to compete in Marseille instead.
Marin Čilić won the title, defeating Kevin Anderson in the final, 7–6(8–6), 6–7(7–9), 6–4.

Seeds

Draw

Finals

Top half

Bottom half

Qualifying

Seeds

Qualifiers

Lucky losers
  Samuel Groth

Qualifying draw

First qualifier

Second qualifier

Third qualifier

Fourth qualifier

External links
 Main draw
 Qualifying draw

Delray Beach International Tennis Championships - Singles
2014 Singles
2014 Delray Beach International Tennis Championships